WSRI may refer to:

 WSRI (FM), a radio station (88.7 FM) licensed to Sugar Grove, Illinois, United States
 Web Science Research Initiative